The NTP pool is a dynamic collection of networked computers that volunteer to provide highly accurate time via the Network Time Protocol to clients worldwide.  The machines that are "in the pool" are part of the pool.ntp.org domain as well as of several subdomains divided by geographical zone and are distributed to NTP clients via round robin DNS. Work is being done to make the geographic zone selection unnecessary, via customized authoritative DNS servers that utilize geolocation software.

 the pool consists of 3,126 active time servers on IPv4 and 1,534 servers on IPv6. Because of the decentralization of this project accurate statistics on the number of clients cannot be obtained, but according to the project's website the pool provides time to 5–15 million systems. Because of client growth the project is in perpetual need of more servers.

The more time servers there are in the pool, the lower the resource demand on each member. Joining the pool requires at least a broadband connection to the Internet, a static IP address, and accurate time from another source (for example another NTP server, from a DCF77 receiver, WWVB receiver or a GPS receiver).

This project was started by Adrian von Bidder in January 2003 after a discussion on comp.protocols.time.ntp about abuse of the public stratum 1 servers. The system has been maintained and developed by Ask Bjørn Hansen since July 2005.

References

External links 
 

Pool
Free software programmed in Perl
Perl software